Asaphodes exoriens is a species of moth in the family Geometridae. This species is endemic to New Zealand and has been found in Central Otago. This is an alpine species and frequents open grassy habitat. They can also be found in upland wetland habitat at altitudes between 800 and 1100 m. Adults are on the wing in March.

Taxonomy
This species was described by Louis Beethoven Prout in 1912 as Larentia exoriens using material collected by George Howes at Glenorchy in Otago in March. In 1917 Edward  Meyrick placed this species in the genus Xanthorhoe. George Hudson discussed and illustrated this species under the name Xanthorhoe exoriens in his 1928 publication The Butterflies and Moths of New Zealand. In 1939 Louis Beethoven Prout placed this species in the genus Larentia. This placement was not accepted by New Zealand taxonomists. In 1971 John S. Dugdale assigned this species to the genus Asaphodes. In 1988 John S. Dugdale confirmed this placement. The male holotype specimen, collected at Glenorchy, is held at the Natural History Museum, London.

Description

Hudson described the species as follows:

Distribution
This species is endemic to New Zealand. It has only been found in Central Otago.

Biology and life cycle

A. exoriens is on the wing in March.

Habitat and host species
A. exoriens is an alpine species that frequents open grassy habitat. The adult moths are found in upland wetland habitat at altitudes of between 800-1100m.

References

Moths described in 1912
Moths of New Zealand
Larentiinae
Endemic fauna of New Zealand
Taxa named by Louis Beethoven Prout
Endemic moths of New Zealand